Below is a list of radio stations in Misamis Oriental, whose coverage is in part or whole of the same (including Cagayan de Oro).

AM Stations

FM Stations

References

Misamis Oriental